The Iordana is a right tributary of the river Câlniștea in Romania. It discharges into the Câlniștea in Uzunu.

References

Rivers of Romania
Rivers of Giurgiu County